Thomas Ross (December 1, 1806 – July 7, 1865) was a Representative to the United States Congress from Pennsylvania.

Son of Mary Ross (1774–1845) and John Ross (1770–1834), Thomas Ross was born in Easton, Northampton County, Pennsylvania. He attended the Doylestown, Pennsylvania, schools. He graduated from Princeton College in 1823. He studied law, was admitted to the bar in 1829 and commenced practice in Doylestown.

He was appointed deputy attorney general of the State for Bucks County in 1829. He was frequently a candidate of the Democratic Party and was also affiliated with the Anti-Masonic Party.

Ross was elected as a Democrat from Pennsylvania's 6th congressional district to the Thirty-first and Thirty-second Congresses.  The district was one previously represented by his father. He resumed the practice of law in Doylestown.  He was buried in Doylestown Cemetery.

Sources
 
 The Political Graveyard

External links
 

1806 births
1865 deaths
Pennsylvania lawyers
People from Bucks County, Pennsylvania
Princeton University alumni
Democratic Party members of the United States House of Representatives from Pennsylvania
Anti-Masonic Party politicians from Pennsylvania
19th-century American politicians
19th-century American lawyers